Mohammed Hamid (born 1957) is a Muslim British national most known for his ties with the 21 July 2005 London Bombings and as a disciple of the radical preacher Abdullah el-Faisel.  Mohammed Hamid had been convicted with having relations and training terrorists involved with the unsuccessful 21 July 2005 London Bombing attack. Also known as “Osama Bin London,”  he has lived a life of crime throughout his life. From petty crimes and drug addiction in his early age, he later became a radical Islamic preacher/tutor of terrorism.

Early life 
Born in 1957, Mohammed Hamid is from an Indian Muslim Family and came to Europe as a child. After moving to Batley, West Yorkshire with his family, he eventually moved to London at the age of 12. From a very young age he got into trouble for shoplifting and committing petty crimes such as stealing snacks as a child. At age 16, he dropped out of school to work at a Fiat garage.  By the age of 19, he was drinking, committing burglaries, and was involved in many illegal acts. As a result he was serving time in the youth detention center. Eventually he would find himself in prison for robbery. In total, Hamid served three prison sentences for his crimes. Also known as “Babou” to his family Mohammed Hamid had four brothers, seven sisters and lived with his parents and relatives while running a clothing business. His first marriage although unregistered was to an Afro-Caribbean woman called Linda from Hackney, east London. His relatives say Muhammed had beaten his wife, committed much physical abuse, and had an abusive personality. At the age of 32 after his divorce, Muhammed became addicted to crack cocaine. When asked about his addiction history, he told the trial the severe extent to his addiction. From selling everything he owned to keep his habit, his addiction left him with nothing in life. As he said himself, he was living like a tramp.  In order to fix his addiction, he moved to India where he met and married his second wife who was a committed Muslim. After he met his new wife and had four children with her, he moved back to Britain with his new family and began to devote his life to the religion of Islam.

Life after religion 
The death of Muhammad Hamid’s father and his new life with his second wife was a big factor in his new dedication to the Islam religion. Soon, Mohammed Hamid rediscovered a new version of his faith after a trip to the Mosque. He opened an Islamic bookshop al-Koran in the Clapton area of east London and started attending rallies at Speaker’s Corner in Hyde Park after the 9/11 attacks for many years. He had devoted his life to living by his religion of Islam and even wore traditional gowns. It was during this time when he began to become increasingly radical and vocal. After attending many rallies and reaching out to Muslim individuals, Mohammed Hamid soon became a disciple of the radical preacher Abdullah el-Faisal, and is known to be influenced by his radical teachings.

21 July 2005 London Bombing 
On Thursday 21 July 2005, 4 terrorist attackers attempted to bomb parts of London’s transportation system but were unsuccessful. The explosions occurred around midday at the Shepherd's Bush, Warren Street and Oval stations in the London underground. There was also an explosion on a bus in Bethnal Green. Only one minor injury was reported during the bombing and the suspects fled the scenes after their bombs failed to explode. As a result, the police operated a manhunt to find the suspects. However, during the manhunt, Jean Charles de Menezes was shot and killed after police misidentified him as one of the suspected bombers. Muktar Ibrahim, 29, Yassin Omar, 26, Ramzi Mohammed, 25, and Hussain Osman, 28, were found guilty of conspiracy to murder.  The four attempted bombers were each sentenced to life imprisonment, with a minimum of 40 years' imprisonment.  With these attempted bombers, Mohammed Hamid and Mousa Brown had also been arrested for relations with these bombers. Mousa Brown was later found not guilty and was dropped of all charges. However, police say that the Islamic extremist Mohammed Hamid played a crucial role in training/preparing the young men who were involved in the 21/7 bombing for terrorism.  There was evidence that Hamid had communicated with these attackers before the attack and after previous terrorist attacks.

Sentencing 
After a five-month trial at the Wollwich crown court, Mohammad Hamid was found guilty of training terrorists in secret camps in the Lake District and New Forest with motive to plot future attacks. This case trial was the first to deal with a new offence under the Terrorism Act of 2006: attending a place for terrorist training. He was arrested, along with fourteen other men after the 2005 London bombings and for providing terrorist training. Hamid was recorded telling his terrorist recruits that he had wanted to see many atrocities before the 2012 Olympics and hailed the September 11 hijackers.  The court ruled that there is evidence that Mohammed Hamid had relations with the four suicide bombers involved in the 21 July 2005 London Bombing and did in fact train them. On 26 February 2008 Hamid was found guilty on three counts of providing terrorist training and three counts of soliciting murder. The court also ruled that he was fully guilty of providing terrorist training to the individuals responsible for the bombing training in the New Forest in April 2006 and at a Berkshire paint balling centre in June 2006. However, the jury at Woolwich Crown Court found him not guilty of providing weapons training. Hamid was said to be training the terrorist bombers through camping trips around the UK, paint balling arenas and was encouraging others to murder non believers.  Mohammed Hamid was sentenced indefinitely with a minimum of seven and a half years for the protection of the public.  Hamid has been regarded as a key figure in extremist networks and his conviction has been viewed a major success for counter-terrorism policies for the court and Britain.

Controversy 
There has been controversy over the imprisonment of Mohammed Hamid. Some claim that Mohammed Hamid is one of the many victims of Britain’s war on terror who has been sent to prison mainly for their Islamic religion. There has been debate that there has not been sufficient evidence to prove that camping and practicing paintball was enough to convict Hamid of training terrorists. When asked about his act of reaching out to many young Muslims, Hamid claimed that he was trying to offer support to Muslims because they were vulnerable after the 9/11 attack.  Along with other supporters, Mohammed’s daughter Yasmin has launched a campaign to demand freedom for her father. She and the supporters claim that Mohammed Hamid had no relations with the London 21/7 attack and claimed Mohammed had been wrongly imprisoned. Mousa Brown had been accused and charged under the 2006 terrorism act for providing terrorist training and receiving terrorist training. The reason for these charges was for his involvement in the sport of paint balling at the locations where Mohammed trained. Later his charges were dropped but there have been claims that Mohammed Hamid was wrongly accused and imprisoned for his Muslim background and has become a victim of prejudice against Muslims.

External links
Don't Panic, I'm Islamic -- Mohammed Hamid paintballing on the BBC
 Free Mohammed Hassan Hamid Campaign: http://freehamid.blogspot.com

References

1957 births
Living people
Tanzanian emigrants to the United Kingdom
British people convicted of robbery
Prisoners and detainees of England and Wales